James Hunt (June 22, 1835 – November 10, 1915) was a Canadian politician.

Born in England, Hunt emigrated to Lower Canada when he was two years old. Hunt as mayor of Bury, Quebec from 1892 to 1901. He was elected to the Legislative Assembly of Quebec for Compton in 1897. A Liberal, he did not run in 1900.

He died in Bury in 1915.

References

1835 births
1915 deaths
English emigrants to pre-Confederation Quebec
Quebec Liberal Party MNAs
Immigrants to Lower Canada
Anglophone Quebec people